Pascal Sylvoz (born July 31, 1965) is a French sprint canoer who competed from the late 1980s to the mid-1990s. He won two medals in the C-4 500 m event at the ICF Canoe Sprint World Championships with a silver (1991) and a bronze (1989).

Sylvoz also competed in three Summer Olympics, earning his best finish of fifth in the C-1 1000 m event twice (1992, 1996).

References

Sports-reference.com profile

1965 births
Canoeists at the 1988 Summer Olympics
Canoeists at the 1992 Summer Olympics
Canoeists at the 1996 Summer Olympics
French male canoeists
Living people
Olympic canoeists of France
ICF Canoe Sprint World Championships medalists in Canadian